Harry Stanley Griffiths (17 November 1912 – 11 June 1981) was an English footballer and baseball international. He played in defence for Everton between 1930 and 1935, but after failing to get a game moved on to Port Vale between 1935 and 1947, playing 190 games in all wartime and peacetime competitions. Outside of the game he was a Police officer, and later became a park keeper.

Career
Griffiths began his career at Everton in 1930, as the "Toffees" won promotion to the First Division as Second Division champions in 1930–31. They then topped the Football League in 1931–32, finishing two points ahead of Arsenal. Dropping to eleventh in 1932–33, Everton won the FA Cup, though Griffiths played no part in the final. They dropped to fourteenth in 1933–34, rising to eight in 1934–35. However Griffiths played little part in these successes, and never played a competitive match for the club during his time at Goodison Park; he did however represented England at baseball.

He joined Port Vale in May 1935. He played thirty games for the "Valiants" in 1935–36, as the club were relegated out of the Second Division after picking up just two points in their final five games. New manager Warney Cresswell, a former teammate at Everton, picked him just eight times in 1936–37, as the club finished mid-table in the Third Division North. Griffiths played 28 games in 1937–38, scoring on the final day of the season in a 1–1 draw with New Brighton; at the end of the season the club were transferred to the Third Division South. He was a key member of new manager Tom Morgan's defence in 1938–39, playing 37 games, and scoring in wins over Swindon Town and Bristol City at The Old Recreation Ground.

Griffiths joined the police at the outbreak of World War II, guesting on occasion for both Vale and Derby County during the war years. He suffered a severe scalp wound after colliding with iron railings during a 3–1 home defeat by Crewe Alexandra on Christmas day 1944; he received five stitches and actually returned to action the next week wearing a black beret.

He was one of six pre-war players that returned to the club in 1946, the others being George Heppell, Arthur Jepson, Alf Bellis, Wilf Smith, and Don Triner. However, he lost his place in the team after manager Billy Frith was replaced by Gordon Hodgson in October 1946, and was released at the end of the 1946–47 season, having made just eight appearances. He played a total of 190 games (103 in the Football League) for Port Vale, scoring 9 goals (3 in the Football League).

Personal life
After leaving football, he joined Meir Heath Cricket Club as a wicketkeeper. He later became a park keeper at Queens Park in Longton.

He married his wife Rene in 1941. She nursed him during his long illness before his death. She, herself, died in 2008 at the age of 96.

Career statistics
Source:

References

1912 births
1981 deaths
Footballers from Liverpool
Officers in English police forces
Players of British baseball
English footballers
Association football defenders
Port Vale F.C. players
Port Vale F.C. wartime guest players
Derby County F.C. wartime guest players
Stoke City F.C. wartime guest players
English Football League players